Waldemar Stanisław Klisiak (born 6 May 1967) is a Polish former ice hockey player. He played for Unia Oświęcim, Sport, HC Vítkovice, HC Val, Zagłębie Sosnowiec, and Naprzód Janów during his career. With Unia Oświęcim he won the Polish league championship six times, in 1992 and from 1999 to 2003. In 1993 Klisiak was named the best player in the Polish league. He also played for the Polish national team at the 1992 Winter Olympics and several World Championships. After his playing career Klisiak became a coach.

References

External links
 

1967 births
Living people
People from Oświęcim
Sportspeople from Lesser Poland Voivodeship
HC Pustertal Wölfe players
HC Vítkovice players
Ice hockey players at the 1992 Winter Olympics
KH Zagłębie Sosnowiec players
Naprzód Janów players
Olympic ice hockey players of Poland
Polish ice hockey coaches
Polish ice hockey right wingers
TH Unia Oświęcim players
Vaasan Sport players
Polish expatriate sportspeople in the Czech Republic
Polish expatriate sportspeople in Finland
Polish expatriate sportspeople in Italy
Polish expatriate ice hockey people
Expatriate ice hockey players in Italy
Expatriate ice hockey players in the Czech Republic
Expatriate ice hockey players in Finland